Pajama party may refer to:

A sleepover
Pajama Party (film), a 1964 film
Pajama Party (group), a 1980s and 1990s R&B trio
Pajama Party (TV series), a television talk show series
"Pajama Party" (Pee-wee's Playhouse), an episode of Pee-wee's Playhouse